The Panzer Division Jüterbog was an armoured division of the Wehrmacht during World War II. Created on 20 February 1945, it was active for a short period of time.

History 
The division was created on 20 February 1945 at the Jüterbog training area. On February 26, 1945, it was ordered to head to the city of Bautzen to give its elements to the 16th Panzer Division which at that time was no more than a Kampfgruppe (‘’Battle Group’’). From 28 February to 5 March 1945, the division was commanded by Generalmajor Dietrich von Müller. At the beginning of March 1945 the Jüterbog Division was dissolved.

Order of battle 

At creation
Divisionsstab
Panzer-Abteilung "Jüterbog" (armored detachment)
   Three companies equipped with Panzer IVs
   Panzerjäger-Kompanie (Sfl.) (tank destroyer company)
Two regiments of Panzergrenadiers
   2 battalions of 3 companies each
Panzer-Aufklärungs-Abteilung "Jüterbog" (armored reconnaissance detachment)
   Staff and two 2 Aufklärungs-Kompanien (reconnaissance companies)
Panzer-Artillerie-Regiment "Jüterbog" (armored artillery regiment)
  1 battery of heavy flak (Sfl.)
  1 battery of light artillery (leFH mot, leichte Feldhaubitze)
  1 battery of heavy artillery (sFH mot, schwere Feldhaubitze)
Panzer-Pionier-Abteilung"Jüterbog" (armored engineer detachment)
   2 companies of motorized engineers 
Signals company, repair company and medical company

By 26 February 1945
Divisionsstab with Divisions-Begleit-Kompanie
Panzer-Abteilung Jüterbog
   1.-4. Kompanie (31 StuG III, 10 Panzer IV/70)
Panzer-Grenadier-Regiment Jüterbog
   I. Bataillon (gep., mechanized)
      1.-4. Kompanie
   II. Bataillon (mot., motorized)
      5.-8. Kompanie
   9. Kompanie (sIG, heavy infantry gun)
   10. Kompanie (Pionier, engineers)
   11. Kompanie (Flak, anti-aircraft)
Panzer-Artillerie-Abteilung Jüterbog
   1. Batterie (leFH, light artillery)
   2. Batterie (leFH)
Panzer-Aufklärungs-Kompanie Jüterbog (6 schwere PSW, 5 leichte PSW, planned; 6 heavy and 5 light reconnaissance vehicles (Panzerspähwagen))
Panzerjäger-Kompanie Jüterbog (10 Jagdpanzer 38 "Hetzer", planned; 10 Hetzer tank destroyers)
Panzer-Nachrichten-Kompanie Jüterbog (armored signal company)
Support units: medical company with ambulances, 120 t heavy lift company, motorized repair company, administrative company, field post office

References

Notes

Bibliography

Further reading 
 Mitcham, Samuel W. German Order of Battle Volume Three: Panzer, Panzer Grenadier, and Waffen SS Divisions in WWII, Stackpole Military History Series, 2007. 
 Mitcham, Samuel W. Panzer Legions: A Guide to the German Army Tank Divisions of World War II and Their Commanders, Stackpole Military History Series, 2006.

External links 

German panzer divisions
Military units and formations established in 1945
Military units and formations disestablished in 1945